The 1955 La Flèche Wallonne was the 19th edition of La Flèche Wallonne cycle race and was held on 30 April 1955. The race started in Charleroi and finished in Liège. The race was won by Stan Ockers.

General classification

References

1955 in road cycling
1955
1955 in Belgian sport
1955 Challenge Desgrange-Colombo